HDMS Agpa [Ap-pa] (: common guillemot) was an  of the Royal Danish Navy that was used primarily on arctic patrols from Greenland.

References 
 

Agdlek-class cutters
Ships built in Svendborg
1974 ships